Santerre may refer to:
 Santerre (region), a geographical area in Picardy, France
 Andy Santerre (born 1968), American racing car driver
 Antoine Joseph Santerre (1752–1809), French businessman and general
 Jean-Baptiste Santerre (1650–1717), French painter